Hugh Howard (1675–1738) was an Irish portrait painter and art collector.

Hugh Howard may also refer to:
 Hugh Howard (1731–1799), Irish MP
 Hugh Howard (1761–1840), Irish MP
 Hugh Howard (historian) (born 1952), American historian